Gary Rush Purdy (born October 8, 1936) is a Canadian materials scientist and engineer. He is a Distinguished University Professor at McMaster University.

Early life and education
Purdy was born on October 8, 1936, in Edmonton, Alberta, Canada. He was born to father Kent Purdy and graduated from McKay Avenue and Victoria Composite High schools. Following high school, he earned his bachelor's degree in mining engineering and his master's degree in metallurgy from the University of Alberta (U of A). During his time at the U of A, he won the Robert Tegler Scholarship from 1957 to 1958 and a National Research Council studentship from 1958 to 1959. Upon graduating from U of A, Purdy attended McMaster University where he won another National Research Council studentship.

Career
Following his PhD, Purdy joined the faculty at McMaster University in 1963. As a professor, he was elected a Fellow of the Royal Society of Canada in 1991. Following his election, he was also inducted into McMaster’s Alumni Gallery. In 2002, his "contributions towards the understanding of diffusion and phase transformations in materials," earned him an election to the Minerals, Metals & Materials Society. The following year, Purdy was also inducted into the National Academy of Engineering for "pioneering theoretical and experimental studies of chemical and structural effects on phase transformations and of interfacial diffusion-induced phenomena."

Personal life
Purdy married nurse Ruby Elinore Smith in 1961 and they had their first child in 1962.

References

Living people
Academic staff of McMaster University
Canadian materials scientists
Canadian engineers
1936 births
University of Alberta alumni
McMaster University alumni
Fellows of the Royal Society of Canada
Fellows of the Minerals, Metals & Materials Society